The Museo Collezione Gianfranco Luzzetti (Gianfranco Luzzetti Collection Museum) is an art museum in Grosseto, Tuscany, Italy.

The art gallery is located in a 17th-century former Clarissine convent, home to the city's cultural centre "Le Clarisse", and opened on 22 December 2019. It houses a collection of paintings and sculptures from the Italian Renaissance, Baroque and Neoclassicism, donated to the City of Grosseto by the antiquarian Gianfranco Luzzetti; most notably, the collection include works by artists such as Antonio Rossellino, Giovanni di Tano Fei, Giambologna, Santi di Tito, Domenico Passignano, Cigoli, Rutilio di Lorenzo Manetti, Giovanni Antonio Galli, Pietro Dandini, Camillo Rusconi and Corrado Giaquinto.

References

Bibliography

External links

2019 establishments in Italy
Art museums and galleries in Tuscany
Museums in Grosseto